Marin Draganja and Mate Pavić were the defending champions but chose not to compete.

Sergey Betov and Alexander Bury won the tournament, beating Ilija Bozoljac and Flavio Cipolla 6–0, 6–3

Seeds

  Victor Baluda /  Konstantin Kravchuk (semifinals)
  Sergey Betov /  Alexander Bury
  Adrián Menéndez-Maceiras /  Franco Skugor (quarterfinals)
  Jordan Kerr /  Fabrice Martin (first round)

Draw

Draw

References
 Main Draw

Tilia Slovenia Openandnbsp;- Doubles
2014 Doubles